Bowien is a surname. Notable people with the surname include:

Danny Bowien (born 1982), American chef and businessman
Jimmy Bowien (born 1933), German record producer, songwriter, and composer
Erwin Bowien (1899–1972), German Nazi opponent, painter and author

See also
Bowen (surname)
Bowie (surname)